The 1935 San Jose State Spartans football team represented State Teachers College at San Jose. The Spartans were led by fourth-year head coach Dudley DeGroot and played home games at Spartan Stadium. The team played as an independent in 1935, after having been a member of the Far Western Conference (FWC) for the previous six seasons. The Spartans finished with a record of five wins, five losses, and one tie (5–5–1).

Schedule

Notes

References

San Jose State
San Jose State Spartans football seasons
San Jose State Spartans football